Thomas Schoorel was the defending champion.
Roberto Bautista-Agut won the final 6–7(7–9), 6–4, 6–3 against Rui Machado.

Seeds

Draw

Finals

Top half

Bottom half

References
 Main Draw
 Qualifying Draw

Rai Open - Singles
2012 Singles